Kaiserwald (Ķeizarmežs) was a Nazi concentration camp near the Riga suburb of Mežaparks in modern-day Latvia.

Kaiserwald was built in March 1943, during the period that the German army occupied Latvia. The first inmates of the camp were several hundred convicts from Germany.

Following the liquidation of the Riga, Liepāja and Daugavpils (Dvinsk) ghettos in June 1943, the remainder of the Jews of Latvia, along with most of the survivors of the liquidation of the Vilna Ghetto, were deported to Kaiserwald.

In early 1944, a number of smaller camps around Riga were brought under the jurisdiction of the Kaiserwald camp.

Following the occupation of Hungary by the Germans, Hungarian Jews were sent to Kaiserwald, as were a number of Jews from Łódź, in Poland. By March 1944, there were 11,878 inmates in the camp and its subsidiaries, 6,182 males and 5,696 females, of whom only 95 were gentiles.

Use of the inmates
Unlike Auschwitz or Treblinka, Kaiserwald was not an extermination camp, and the inmates were put to work by large German companies, notably Allgemeine Elektrizitäts-Gesellschaft, which used a large number of female slaves from Kaiserwald in the production of electrical goods, such as batteries.

Evacuation
On 5 August 1944, as the Red Army advanced westwards and entered Latvia, the Germans began to evacuate the inmates of Kaiserwald to Stutthof, in Poland. All Jews under 18 or over 30 were murdered along with anyone who had been convicted of any offence or anyone who it was thought would be unable to survive the trip from Latvia to Poland. The remaining inmates who did not die during the journey arrived at Stutthof in September 1944.

The Red Army took over the camp on 15 October 1944 and later used the camp to house Axis prisoners of war.

See also
 List of Nazi concentration camps

Bibliography

References

External links
 Helen Rodak-Izso - "The Last Chance to Remember"
 Museum of Tolerance - Kaiserwald

 
Nazi concentration camps in Latvia
Generalbezirk Lettland